Undecided Records was an American independent record label established in 1998 by Clifford Wiener and Alexander Kenny. The record company was founded in Loxahatchee, Florida but its headquarters moved around in various parts of Palm Beach County, Florida; first to Boca Raton, then to Parkland, and finally to Lake Worth. The record label released hardcore, metalcore, noisecore, post-hardcore and emo music, with a principally North American roster of artists spanning from the late 1990s to the mid-2000s. Undecided Records released music on vinyl records, compact discs and digital audio formats, with distribution in the United States through Revelation Records, Victory Records and RED Music. Wiener and Kenny were both closely associated with Eulogy Recordings, where they worked in their free time.

Undecided Records put out such notable releases as Poison the Well's Distance Makes the Heart Grow Fonder, Every Time I Die's The Burial Plot Bidding War, Supermachiner's Rise of the Great Machine and Breaking Pangaea's Take Apart the Words and Cannon to a Whisper. The record label was also responsible for producing a series of Metallica tribute splits titled Crush 'Em All, which included covers by BoySetsFire, Converge, Countervail, Disembodied, Indecision, Eighteen Visions, Poison the Well, Shai Hulud, Supermachiner, Today Is the Day and Walls of Jericho. Many of the splits fell apart during varying production stages but Undecided Records compiled the bulk of the recorded cover songs on the Various Artists compilation The Old, The New, The Unreleased, released in January 2005.

In 2003, Wiener, Kenny and Michael Broder formed the imprint company Undecided Films, with plans to release theatrical films and digital video discs. The company's inaugural project was to be a reissue of F. W. Murnau's 1922 film Nosferatu, featuring a new score composed by Converge vocalist Jacob Bannon. Undecided Films' first DVD release later turned out to be the documentary Rockets Redglare!, dedicated to the memory of stand-up comedian Rockets Redglare, featuring interviews with Steve Buscemi, Jim Jarmusch, Matt Dillon and Willem Dafoe. In June 2003, Undecided Records formed a partnership with Further Seems Forever bassist Chad Neptune, financing his own imprint record label Pompano Basic.

Undecided Records was dissolved in 2006 when Wiener and Kenny founded a series of new imprints. In May 2006, all of the straight-edge bands previously signed to Undecided Records were transferred to the new record label x1981x Records, which had already been founded as an apparel company, x1981x Clothing, in 2004. The remaining bands were transferred to a second new record label, 567 Records, including Further Seems Forever, which released the compilation The Final Curtain, and Jeremy Enigk, who released The Missing Link, both originally scheduled for Undecided Records. Undecided Records began re-releasing its entire back-catalog digitally in early 2007. Wiener, Kenny and John Wylie of Eulogy Recordings later formed the artist management firm Big Hit Management in 2010. Wiener and Kenny also organized the music festival Bringin' it Back for the Kids Fest, which took place in 2011 and 2012.

Artists 
This is a partial list of artists who have worked with Undecided Records.

BoySetsFire
Breaking Pangaea
The Casket Lottery
Converge
Disembodied
Eiffel
Eighteen Visions
Every Time I Die
Further Seems Forever
Indecision
Jeremy Enigk
Madison
New Idea Society
Poison the Well
Shai Hulud
Supermachiner
Today Is the Day
Vaux
Walls of Jericho

See also 

 List of record labels

References

External links 

 
 



1998 establishments in Florida
2006 disestablishments in Florida
American independent record labels
American record labels
Companies based in Boca Raton, Florida
Companies based in Florida
Defunct companies based in Florida
Defunct record labels of the United States
Hardcore record labels
Heavy metal record labels
Indie rock record labels
Post-hardcore record labels
Record labels based in Florida
Record labels established in 1998
Record labels disestablished in 2006
Rock record labels
Undecided Records